Chilko may refer to:

Chilko River
Tŝilhqox Biny, known as Chilko Lake.

See also
Nechacco, a paddle steamer re-registered as "Chilco".